The Dream Show 2: In A Dream (stylized as NCT DREAM TOUR 'THE DREAM SHOW2 : In A DREAM') is an ongoing second concert tour headlined by NCT Dream, the third sub-unit of South Korean boy group NCT, in support of their second studio album Glitch Mode (2022). The tour, which kicked off in September 2022, was the group's first in-person concert tour in three years.

Background
NCT Dream planned to hold concerts at the Gocheok Sky Dome in Seoul from July 29 to 31, but cancelled them after members Mark and Renjun tested positive for COVID-19. The event was rescheduled on September 8 and 9 at the Jamsil Olympic Stadium, nearly four times larger in capacity than the original venue, and served as the opening performance to their second tour, The Dream Show 2: In A Dream. It marked the group's first concert featuring all seven members since their debut in 2016. The second show was broadcast on the platform Beyond Live. A concert film, NCT Dream The Movie: In A Dream documenting the concert was released digitally on November 30. It was made available in theaters on November 30 in South Korea and on December 6 in Japan. A trailer preceded the film on November 7, and the group's tour production company confirmed plans to release it in 75 countries. The tour will continue in Japan with five concerts in Nagoya, Yokohama and Fukuoka. The concert held in Yokohama on November 27 was broadcast on Beyond Live.

On February 15, 2023, SM Entertainment announced new dates, with additional legs in the United States, Europe, and Asia from March to May 2023. It will be NCT Dream's first tour outside Asia.

Setlist
This set list is from the concert on September 8, 2022, in Seoul. It is not intended to represent all shows from the tour.

 "Glitch Mode"
 "Countdown (3, 2, 1)"
 "Stronger"
 "Dreaming"
 "Déjà Vu"
 "My First and Last"
 "Bye My First"
 "Love Again"
 "To My First"
 "Sorry, Heart"
 "Puzzle Piece"
 "Chewing Gum"
 "ANL"
 "Dive Into You"
 "Irreplaceable"
 "Saturday Drip"
 "Quiet Down"
 "Better Than Gold"
 "Life is Still Going On"
 "Diggity"
 "Fire Alarm"
 "Ridin'"
 "Go"
 "Boom"
 "Hello Future"
 "We Go Up"
 "Trigger The Fever"
 "Hot Sauce"
Encore
 "Beatbox"
 "My Youth"
 "Dear Dream"
 "On The Way"
 "Walk You Home"

Shows

Notes

References

2022 concert tours
2023 concert tours
Beyond Live
Concert tours of Japan
Concert tours of South Korea